Joseph Leo Hurley (April 20, 1898 – April 29, 1956) was an American Democratic politician who served as the 52nd Lieutenant Governor for the Commonwealth of Massachusetts from 1935 to 1937.

Early life
Hurley was born to John and Margaret (Sullivan) Hurley on April 20, 1898 in Fall River, Massachusetts. Hurley was of Irish descent.

Marriage and Children
Hurley married Celeste Tracy they had 3 children.

See also
 1925–1926 Massachusetts legislature
 1927–1928 Massachusetts legislature

References

Lieutenant Governors of Massachusetts
1898 births
1956 deaths
United States Army personnel of World War I
Georgetown University alumni
Georgetown University Law Center alumni
Democratic Party members of the Massachusetts House of Representatives
Mayors of Fall River, Massachusetts
20th-century American politicians